Satish Chandra is a 1965 batch retired Indian Foreign Service officer. He is currently the Vice chairperson of the New Delhi based think tank Vivekananda International Foundation.

Chandra has served as India's Permanent representative to United Nations Office at Geneva. His prior assignments include chairperson, Joint Intelligence Committee. He has served as the Deputy NSA under NSA Brajesh Mishra, and as a diplomat to Indian missions in Pakistan, Bangladesh, and the United States of America.

It was during his tenure as Indian High Commissioner to Pakistan when India conducted Pokharan nuclear tests.

See also
Arvind Gupta
Ajit Doval
Vivekananda International Foundation

References 

High Commissioners of India to Pakistan

Living people

Year of birth missing (living people)